Freedom, Socialism and Revolution is a Trotskyist political organisation in Brazil, created in 2009 by the fusion of Socialismo Revolucionário (Revolutionary Socialism) and Colectivo Liberdade Socialista (Socialist Liberty Collective). LSR is an active tendency of the Socialism and Liberty Party (PSOL) and the Brazilian section of International Socialist Alternative (formerly the Committee for a Workers' International).

LSR members are active on several fronts, including schools, factories, non-industrial workplaces, and neighbourhoods, organizing against government abuses.  They are active in the mass organizations of the working class and the youth, in the trade unions, in the Conlutas union confederation, workplace associations, student unions and school entities, defending the unification of struggles and linking immediate demands and struggles with the general struggle against capitalism.

References

External links
Freedom, Socialism and Revolution
Committee for a Workers' International

2009 establishments in Brazil
Far-left politics in Brazil
Organizations established in 2009
International Socialist Alternative
Socialism and Liberty Party
Trotskyist organisations in Brazil
Far-left political parties